Musnad Abu Hanifa is one of the collection of sayings of    Islamic scholar Imam Abu Hanifa (80 AH- 150 AH).

Description
It contains almost five hundred (500) hadiths.  The book is not directly written by Imam Abu Hanifa himself but rather compiled by his students. It is written in the closest time of the life of Prophet Muhammad.

Publications
The book has been published by many publishers across the globe: 
 Musnad Imam Abu Hanifah (r.a): Published:Book on Demand (1 Jan. 1901) Musnad Imam Ul a Zam Abu Hanifah R.a: Published:Book on Demand Pod

See also
 List of Sunni books
 Musnad al-Shafi'i
 Musnad Ahmad ibn Hanbal
 Muwatta Malik
 Kutub al-Sittah
 Majma al-Zawa'id

References

Hanafi literature
Sunni hadith collections